Captain Cook is a census-designated place (CDP) in Hawaii County, Hawaii, in the United States, located in the District of South Kona. The community, within the land division of Kealakekua, is so named because the post office for the area was located in the Captain Cook Coffee Co. during the early 1900s. As of the 2010 census the CDP population was 3,429, up from 3,206 at the 2000 census. As of March 2022, a resolution was under consideration to rename the town to "Kawa'aloa", meaning "long landing place".

Geography
Captain Cook is located on the west side of the island of Hawaii at  (19.498211, -155.904275). It is bordered to the north by Kealakekua and to the south by Honaunau-Napoopoo. Hawaii Route 11, part of the Hawaii Belt Road, passes through the community, leading north  to Kailua-Kona and south  to Naalehu. Hawaii Route 160 diverges from Route 11 in Captain Cook, leading south by a winding road  to Napoopoo on Kealakekua Bay.

It sits on the top of an ancient fault which created the famous Kealakekua Bay. Prior to the 1960s, most of Captain Cook was part of the vast Kealakekua Ranch, founded in the 1850s by English immigrant Henry Nicholas Greenwell.

Demographics

As of the census of 2010, there were 3,429 people in 1,258 households residing in the CDP. The racial makeup of the CDP was 31.44% White, 0.67% African American, 0.38% American Indian & Alaska Native, 27.65% Asian, 10.67% Native Hawaiian & Pacific Islander, 2.16% from other races, and 27.03% from two or more races. Hispanic or Latino of any race were 9.51% of the population.

There were 1,258 households, out of which 22.0% had children under the age of 18 living with them.  The average household size was 2.73.

In the Captain Cook CDP the population was spread out, with 20.6% under the age of 18, 7.0% from 18 to 24, 11.6% from 25 to 34, 15.4% from 35 to 49, 28.3% from 50 to 64, and 17.1% who were 65 years of age or older.  For every 100 females, there were 101.1 males. For every 100 males there were 98.9 females.

For the period 2011–2015, the median estimated annual income for a household in the CDP was $66,276, and the median income for a family was $73,661. Male full-time workers had a median income of $35,833 versus $42,344 for females. The per capita income for the CDP was $38,885. About 10.2% of families and 8.8% of the population were below the poverty line, including 15.5% of those under age 18 and 5.5% of those age 65 or over.

Lava zones, redlining, and insurance issues
Captain Cook shares much in common with the District of Puna. Both districts are situated on active volcanoes and contain large sections of land that are in Lava Flow Hazard Zone 2. Additionally, new lava hazard zones 11, 12, and 13 are being established to account for current flow activity to reduce redlining.

Points of interest
 Amy B. H. Greenwell Ethnobotanical Garden
 Koa Coffee Plantation
 Kona Coffee Living History Farm
 Rodney J. T. Yano Memorial Hall

Education

Hawaii Department of Education operates Konawaena Elementary School in the CDP.

Two schools, Konawaena Middle School and Konawaena High School, are on a campus partially in Captain Cook CDP and partially in Kealakekua CDP.

References

Census-designated places in Hawaii County, Hawaii
Populated places on Hawaii (island)
Populated coastal places in Hawaii